Eastern Sunz is a hip hop duo from Portland, Oregon, known for "intellectual hip hop" that often focuses on political, social, and environmental issues. They have released a number of albums, and in 2012 won the John Lennon Songwriting Contest and International Songwriting Contest for lyrics on their EP Filthy Hippie Music. Their fifth album Corroded Utopia features Promoe (Looptroop Rockers) and Smoke (Old Dominion).

Members
Current
Aaron "Courage" Harris - MC
Travis "TravisT" Taylor - MC, DJ

Discography

Albums

Awards and nominations

Further reading

Eastern Sunz Discography at Allmusic

References

External links
EasternSunz.com
Eastern Sunz on Facebook
Eastern Sunz on Instagram
Eastern Sunz on Twitter
Eastern Sunz on Bandcamp

Musical groups from Portland, Oregon